Lexie Lauren Hull (born September 13, 1999) is an American professional basketball player for the Indiana Fever of the Women's National Basketball Association (WNBA). She played college basketball for the Stanford Cardinal, with whom she was a three-time All-Pac-12 selection, won the national championship as a junior and received the Senior CLASS Award and Elite 90 Award in her senior season. Hull attended Central Valley High School in Spokane Valley, Washington, where she helped her team win two state titles and was rated a five-star recruit by ESPN.

Early life and high school career
Hull was born on September 13, 1999, and lived in the Spokane suburb of Liberty Lake, Washington. She grew up playing basketball against her twin sister, Lacie. From third to eighth grade, Hull was coached by her father and his friend, Ron Hawkins, with the Lady Cubs Amateur Athletic Union (AAU) program. She competed for Central Valley High School in Spokane Valley, Washington from 2014 to 2018. As a freshman, Hull averaged 13.8 points and 6.3 rebounds per game. In her sophomore season, she averaged 18.1 points and 8.6 rebounds per game, leading her team to the Class 4A state title, where she was named tournament most valuable player (MVP). She also won the Associated Press (AP) Class 4A Player of the Year award.

As a junior at Central Valley, Hull averaged 16.5 points, 7.3 rebounds and 3.2 steals per game, guiding her team to a fourth-place finish at the state tournament. She was honored as Washington Gatorade Player of the Year, AP Class 4A Player of the Year and Greater Spokane League MVP. As a senior, Hull averaged 20.4 points, 8.4 rebounds, 2.6 steals and 2.1 assists per game. She led Central Valley to a 29–0 record and the Class 4A state title, earning tournament MVP. Hull also led her team to the GEICO Nationals championship, posting 26 points and 10 rebounds to upset Hamilton Heights Christian Academy in the title game. She was named Washington Gatorade Player of the Year, AP Washington All-Classification Player of the Year, The News Tribune Player of the Year, The Seattle Times Co-Player of the Year with Lacie and Greater Spokane League MVP. Hull finished her high school career as Central Valley's all-time leading scorer.

During high school, Hull played for the Spokane Stars on the AAU circuit. In addition to basketball, she competed in track for four years, making the all-conference team, and volleyball for one year at the varsity level for Central Valley.

Recruiting
Hull was a five-star recruit and the number 14 player in the 2018 class by ESPN. On October 23, 2016, she committed to play college basketball for Stanford along with her sister. Hull chose the Cardinal over offers from Gonzaga, Washington, Washington State, Oregon and Arizona State. She had been drawn to the engineering and business programs at Stanford University, and a home visit in September by head coach Tara VanDerveer helped secure her commitment.

College career

On November 7, 2018, Hull made her debut for Stanford, recording 11 points, 11 rebounds and four steals in a 71–43 win against UC Davis. She became the first freshman in program history to register a double-double in their debut. In her next game, on November 11, Hull scored a season-high 17 points in a 115–71 win over Idaho. As a freshman, Hull averaged 5.6 points and 4.7 rebounds per game, and helped Stanford win the Pac-12 Tournament. She made the Pac-12 All-Freshman honorable mention, despite missing nine games with a left foot injury. She became a full-time starter in her sophomore season. On January 24, 2020, Hull scored a season-high 29 points in a 76–68 overtime win over Colorado. She helped her team return to the Pac-12 Tournament final after recording 28 points and nine rebounds in a 67–51 semifinal victory over UCLA. As a sophomore, she averaged 13.6 points, six rebounds and 2.1 assists per game, earning All-Pac-12 and Pac-12 All-Defensive honors.

Hull scored a junior season-high 24 points in a 75–55 win over UCLA at the 2021 Pac-12 Tournament title game. She was named to the all-tournament team. At the Elite Eight of the NCAA tournament, Hull posted 21 points and nine rebounds in a 78–63 victory against Louisville. She had 18 points and 13 rebounds in a 66–65 win over South Carolina at the Final Four. In the title game, Hull recorded 10 points and 10 rebounds in a 54–53 win against Arizona, helping Stanford win its first national championship since 1992. She was selected to the Final Four all-tournament team. As a junior, Hull averaged 11.6 points and 5.1 rebounds per game, and repeated on the All-Pac-12 Team. On January 7, 2022, she scored 33 points and made seven three-pointers in an 80–68 victory over Oregon. She won her third Pac-12 Tournament. In the second round of the 2022 NCAA tournament, Hull scored a career-high 36 points with six three-pointers in a 91–65 win against Kansas. She helped Stanford return to the Final Four. As a senior, Hull averaged 12.5 points, 5.1 rebounds and 2.2 steals per game, earning her third consecutive All-Pac-12 selection. On April 4, 2022, she declared for the 2022 WNBA draft.

Professional career
Hull was selected with the sixth overall pick by the Indiana Fever in the 2022 WNBA draft, despite being projected as a late first-round or second-round prospect by most media outlets.

WNBA career statistics

Regular season

|-
| align="left" | 2022
| align="left" | Indiana
| 26 || 4 || 12.8 || .267 || .186 || .900 || 1.5 || 0.7 || 0.6 || 0.1 || 0.7 || 3.8
|-
| align="left" | Career
| align="left" | 1 year, 1 team
| 26 || 4 || 12.8 || .267 || .186 || .900 || 1.5 || 0.7 || 0.6 || 0.1 || 0.7 || 3.8

Personal life
Hull is the daughter of Jaime and Jason Hull. She has an identical twin sister, Lacie, who has been her basketball teammate in high school and college. Hull's father, Jason, played college basketball for Whitworth University, where he received NCAA Division III All-American honors. Her grandfather, John, played college basketball for Western Washington.

Hull had a 4.0 grade point average (GPA) in high school. She graduated from Stanford with both a bachelor's degree and master's degree in management science and engineering. In her junior and senior years, Hull was named a first-team Academic All-American by the College Sports Information Directors of America (CoSIDA). She is a three-time CoSIDA Academic All-District first team and Pac-12 Academic Honor Roll selection. As a senior, Hull received the Elite 90 Award for having the highest cumulative GPA among players at the Final Four of the 2022 NCAA Tournament, as well as Pac-12 Scholar-Athlete of the Year for women's basketball and the Senior CLASS Award as the outstanding senior both on and off the court in D-I women's basketball.

References

External links
Stanford Cardinal bio

1999 births
Living people
American women's basketball players
Basketball players from Spokane, Washington
Shooting guards
Stanford Cardinal women's basketball players
Twin sportspeople
American twins
Indiana Fever draft picks
Indiana Fever players